Robert Francis McGuinness (born 29 January 1954) is a Scottish former footballer, who played as a forward for Lesmahagow, Motherwell, Portsmouth and St Johnstone.

References

External links
 

Scottish footballers
English Football League players
1954 births
Living people
Motherwell F.C. players
Portsmouth F.C. players
St Johnstone F.C. players
Lesmahagow F.C. players
Hakoah Sydney City East FC players
Scottish expatriate footballers
Expatriate soccer players in Australia
Scottish expatriate sportspeople in Australia
Scottish Football League players
Association football forwards
Footballers from Motherwell